Michael Shirkie Phillips (18 January 1933 - January 2020) was a Scottish professional footballer who played as a forward.

References

1933 births
2020 deaths
People from Cumnock
Scottish footballers
Association football forwards
Cumnock Juniors F.C. players
Grimsby Town F.C. players
Cheltenham Town F.C. players
Stranraer F.C. players
English Football League players
Footballers from East Ayrshire